Homalocalyx coarctatus is a member of the family Myrtaceae endemic to Western Australia.

It blooms between September and November producing red-pink-purple flowers.

It is found on sand plains in the northern Wheatbelt and the Mid West regions of Western Australia where it grows in sandy soils.

References

coarctatus
Endemic flora of Western Australia
Myrtales of Australia
Rosids of Western Australia
Plants described in 1987
Taxa named by Ferdinand von Mueller